Jazzmine Raycole Dillingham (born February 11, 1988) is an American actress and dancer. She is best known for her role as Claire Kyle on the sitcom My Wife and Kids during its first season.

Early life and education
Raycole was born as Jazzmine Raycole Dillingham in Stockton, California, the daughter of Ray, a water company superintendent, and Claudia Dillingham, who owned a dance studio and managed Raycole's career during her childhood. A trained dancer, Raycole first danced when she was a toddler. Raycole studied dance under both her mother and Barbara Faulkner, and was a competitive dancer by the age of four. She was part of the Boston Ballet in 2001, and also taught dance classes that year. Raycole was home schooled by her mother.

Career
Raycole's acting career began in 1995, when she appeared in two films: voicing a puppy in Babe and as Onika Harris in Waiting to Exhale. One of her earliest roles on television was a guest spot on sitcom Ellen. She also once featured as the voice of a one-time appearing character named Chloe on Nickelodeon's Hey Arnold! in 2003.

In 2001, Raycole appeared in the first dozen episodes of My Wife and Kids as Claire Kyle, with Damon Wayans portraying her father. However, she was subsequently replaced on the show by Jennifer Freeman when the second season began. It is reported that Raycole herself said "I was 12 years old when I got that job. The producers wanted a different thing, they wanted someone a little bit older. I wasn't ready for that," she said. "I ended up going to New York to dance, which was my first passion. I really thank God for that because I got to grow and travel."

She has made several guest appearances on television series, including Malcolm & Eddie, The Jamie Foxx Show, Smart Guy, Everybody Hates Chris, Monk and Crazy Ex-Girlfriend. Between 2007 and 2008, she portrayed Allison Hawkins in the post-apocalyptic drama Jericho. She replaced Geffri Maya Hightower, who played the role in the show's pilot episode. Raycole appeared regularly as Lyric Ballentine on the TV Land sitcom The Soul Man (2012−14). From 2017 to 2018, Raycole starred as college student Sydney Fletcher on the BET series The Quad. She also played the daughter of Stanley Hudson on the TV show The Office.

Raycole appeared as Mae, the girlfriend of Kimiko Glenn's character, in the television film Ghosting: The Spirit of Christmas (2019). She portrayed Sage, a pregnant woman who has Gerstmann-Straussler-Scheinker syndrome, in short-lived series Council of Dads. In 2020, Raycole was set to play in the lead role of Izzy, Mickey's client in the drama series The Lincoln Lawyer, which was based on novel and was written by David E. Kelley, however the pilot was passed by CBS due to the scheduling conflict, but on February 2, 2021, Raycole returned in the lead role of Izzy in The Lincoln Lawyer with Manuel Garcia-Rulfo replacing Logan Marshall-Green as Mickey Haller.

Filmography

Film

Television

References

External links
 Jazz Raycole's biography at WCHS-TV

1988 births
Actresses from California
Living people
People from Stockton, California
African-American female dancers
Dancers from California
American television actresses
African-American actresses
American film actresses
African-American child actresses
American child actresses
21st-century African-American people
21st-century African-American women
20th-century African-American people
20th-century African-American women